Google Street View was first introduced in the United States on May 25, 2007, and until November 26, 2008, featured camera icon markers, each representing at least one major city or area (such as a park), and usually the other nearby cities, towns, suburbs, and parks. Many areas that had coverage were represented by icons.

Key additions

 In 2005, Street View project begins, Google employees start the first tests using a van equipped with cameras on the roof in the San Francisco area.
 On May 25, 2007, Street View was announced.
 On May 30, 2007, at the Where 2.0 Conference, Immersive Media Company was identified as the contractor that captured the imagery for four of the five cities initially mapped by Street View, using its patented dodecahedral camera array on a moving car. Immersive Media continued to do image capture for Street View until Google developed its own capability to do so. Since July 2007, Google has used imagery that belongs exclusively to Google.
 On April 16, 2008, Street View was fully integrated into Google Earth 4.3.
 On May 5, 2008, Google improves its quality, the captures become in high quality.
 On May 12, 2008, Google announced that it was testing face-blurring technology on its photos of the busy streets of Manhattan. The technology uses a computer algorithm to search Google's image database for faces and blurs them, according to John Hanke, director of Google Earth and Google Maps.
 On June 10, 2008, two other features included in the update were an effective mask of the "Google Car" and the application of face-blurring technology on all photos, which effectively lowered the resolution across all photos, even the formerly impressive high resolution images of San Francisco. Also, many nearby metro areas were included, but they did not receive their own camera icons.
 On July 2, 2008, Google Street View was introduced in France and Italy, providing the first service outside the United States and the debut of Google's new 4th Generation Cameras. On this day, 19 camera icons were added, mostly showing small towns and areas along the Tour de France route and part of northwestern Italy.
 On August 4, 2008, 28 icons of major metropolitan areas of both Australia and Japan were added to Google Street View. Included in the update were approximately 40 new U.S. hub cities.
 On November 26, 2008, the Street View button and all the camera icons were deleted. Instead of clicking the "Street View" button, this is now accessed using the "pegman" button in the left hand corner. When the "pegman" icon is dragged over the map blue polylines appear where Street View is available and a small window will show the current Street View. If this is dropped on the map the Street View opens and takes over the whole map window.
 On December 1, 2008, New Zealand was added to Google Street View. Faces were blurred upon recommendation by the New Zealand Privacy Commission, but vehicle registration plates were not obscured.
 On April 9, 2009, Street View became available with a full-screen option.
 On June 5, 2009, Smart Navigation was introduced which allows users to navigate around the panoramas by double-clicking with their cursor on any place or object they want to see.
 In January 2010, Google begins to introduce the 3rd generation of cameras allowing better quality in the captured images.
 In mid June 2010, Google added blue dots to its maps that display user-submitted images in all locations around the world, including land areas where Street View is not available and bodies of water. These images can be pulled up on the screen in the same manner as a Street View image with the pegman by dragging it onto the blue dot.
 On October 30, 2012, Google announced that users could contribute to Street View by creating a panorama-like image from the Galaxy Nexus smartphone to share on Google Maps.
 On February 14, 2013, Wii Street U was released for the Wii U.
 On June 27, 2013, Google announced that users could contribute to Street View by creating a panorama-like image from the Galaxy non-Nexus smartphone to share on Google Maps.
 On November 6, 2013, Google reintroduces Pegman, having disappeared a few months, to make way for a new design, and even Pegman who introduces the icons following the location.
 On April 23, 2014, a new historical Street View option was introduced to new Google Maps. The date of panoramas can be selected from the timeline.
 Starting in August 2017, Google allows users to create their own street view-like blue paths, for the connected photospheres that are sufficiently close to one another.
 On September 7, 2017, Google announces the arrival of a new generation of more efficient and precise cameras on the occasion of the 10th anniversary of Street View. This is the 4th generation of cameras, sporting a more refined profile and a blue color.
 On December 3, 2020, Google announced that users could contribute to Street View by capturing video using their AR-supported phones using the Street View app.
 May 24, 2022: Google announces the arrival of a new generation 4 camera on the occasion of the 15th anniversary of Street View for 2023, this one will be able to cover areas less accessible by car thanks to its advantage of weighing less 7 kilograms.
 May 24, 2022: Google announces history feature of Street View on iOS and Android, allowing users to view past shots of area that have been captures repeatedly.

Timeline of introductions
For the virtual tours of museums, see Google Arts and Culture#Timeline of introductions

2007

2008

2009

2010

2011

2012

2013

2014

2015

2016

2017

2018

2019

2020

2021

2022

2023

Official coverage by country οr territory
Below is a table showing the countries available on Street View and the year they were first added. Plain text indicates that a country has only views of certain businesses and/or tourist attractions.

Current coverage
Bold with an asterisk (*) indicates countries with public street view available
{| class="wikitable sortable" style="font-size:90%"
|-
! Country or territory !! style="width:150px;"| Continent !! Notes
|-
| * || Europe || Autonomous region of Finland.
|-
| *|| Europe ||
|-
| * || Oceania ||
|-
| *|| Europe ||
|-
| * || Antarctica ||
|-
| *|| South America ||
|-
| *|| Oceania || Added on the same day as Japan. On August 4, 2008, 28 icons of major metropolitan areas were added.
|-
| * || Europe ||
|-
| *|| Asia ||
|-
| * || Europe || Historical center of Minsk only.
|-
| *|| Europe ||
|-
| *|| North America ||
|-
| *|| Asia || First South Asian country available.
|-
| * || South America ||
|-
| *|| Africa ||
|-
| *|| South America || First country available in South America.
|-
| * ||  Asia || Views of Peros Banhos and many other islands.
|-
| *|| Europe ||
|-
| *|| Asia ||
|-
| *|| North America ||
|-
| *|| South America ||
|-
| * || Asia || Only touristic places such as museums received coverage
|-
| * || Asia ||
|-
| * || Asia ||
|-
| * || South America ||
|-
| *|| North America || Touristic locations only: views of some National Parks, beaches and very limited views around Heredia and San Jose.
|-
| * || Europe||In 2022, Google returned to capture street view images in Croatia after an 11 year hiatus.
|-
| * || North America ||
|-
| *|| Europe ||
|-
| *|| Europe ||
|-
| * || North America || Only around Santo Domingo and Santiago de los Caballeros.
|-
| * || South America ||
|-
| * || Asia & Africa || A few touristic landmarks such as the Giza necropolis.
|-
| *|| Europe ||
|-
| * || Africa ||
|-
| * || South America || New Island, West Point Island and Carcass Island only.
|-
| * || Europe ||
|-
| *|| Europe ||
|-
| * || Europe || Added on the same day as Italy, one of the first two countries available in Europe. Providing the first service outside the United States and the debut of Google's new 2nd Generation Cameras.
|-
| * || Europe|| 20 biggest cities in addition to some touristic landmarks.
|-
| * || Africa ||
|-
| * || Europe ||
|-
| * || Europe ||
|-
| * || North America ||
|-
| * || North America ||
|-
| * || Asia || First place with Street View in mainland Asia, along with Macau.
|-
| * || Europe ||
|-
| * || Europe ||
|-
| * || Asia || All Major cities across India as well as some rural areas, plans to cover entire India.
|-
| * || Asia ||
|-
| * || Asia || National Museum of Iraq only.
|-
| * || Europe ||
|-
| * || Europe ||
|-
| * || Asia || First West Asian country available, along with Palestine.
|-
| * || Europe || Added on the same day as France, one of the first two countries available in Europe.
|-
| * || Asia || First country available in Asia, added on the same day as Australia. Also one of the first two island countries with Street View.
|-
| * || Europe ||
|-
| * || Asia || 43 archaeological locations covered, public Street View available since April 2018.
|-
| * || Africa || Public Street View available since October 2018.
|-
| * || Asia ||
|-
| * || Asia || First Central Asian country available.
|-
| * || Asia || Vientiane only until May 2016 when Luang Prabang, Vang Vieng, Pakse and Savannakhet were added.
|-
| * || Europe ||
|-
| * || Asia || Landmarks views since 2018.
|-
| * || Africa ||
|-
| * || Europe ||
|-
| * || Europe||Complete update of Luxembourg's road network underway 2022
|-
| Mali|Africa
|Various historical sites.
|-
| * || Asia || First place with Street View in mainland Asia, along with Hong Kong.
|-
| * || Africa || Limited coverage to a few spots, mostly touristic places.
|-
| * || Asia || Landmarks only until September 2014.
|-
| * || Europe ||
|-
| * || North America || First available territory in the Caribbean, only a few touristic landmarks.
|-
| *|| North America || First Latin American country to be added to Google Street View.
|-
| * || Europe ||
|-
| * || Asia ||
|-
| * || Europe ||
|-
| * || Asia || Mountain landmarks only.
|-
| * || Europe ||
|-
| * || Oceania ||
|-
| * || Africa ||
|-
| * || Europe ||
|-
| * || Oceania ||
|-
| *|| Europe ||
|-
| * || Asia || Landmarks only.
|-
| * || Asia || First West Asian place available, along with Israel.
|-
| *|| South America ||
|-
| * || Asia ||
|-
| * || Oceania ||
|-
| * || Europe ||
|-
| *|| Europe ||
|-
| * || North America || First Caribbean state available.
|-
| * || Asia|| Museum and airport views, including a view inside of planes
|-
| * || Africa ||
|-
| * || Europe || First Southeast European country available.
|-
| * || Europe & Asia || Museum view only until 2012.
|-
| Rwanda*
|Africa
|First country with 4th generation coverage only. The fastest country to receive its first coverage after starting to collect the Street View data (2 months)).
|-
| * || North America || Full coverage of all main streets along with some trekkers on both islands from September 2021.
|-
| * || Europe ||
|-
| * || Africa || First West African country available.
|-
| * || Europe ||
|-
| * || Asia || First Southeast Asian country available.
|-
| * || Europe ||
|-
| *|| Europe ||
|-
| * || Africa || First country available in Africa.
|-
| * || South America & Antarctica ||
|-
| * || Europe ||
|-
| * || Asia ||
|-
| * || Europe || Views of Longyearbyen, Pyramiden, Barentsburg along with boat views.
|-
| *|| Europe ||
|-
| * || Europe || First Central European country available and first landlocked country with Street View.
|-
| *|| Asia ||
|-
|* || Africa || Few landmarks such as Mount Kilimanjaro and the Gombe National Park.
|-
| * || Asia ||
|-
| * || Africa || First North African country available.
|-
| *|| Europe & Asia ||
|-
| * || Africa || First East African country available.
|-
| * || Europe ||
|-
| * || Asia || Landmarks available since 2013, Dubai only until September 2015.
|-
| * || Europe || First North European country available.
|-
| * || North America || First country available to view on Street View.
|-
| * || Oceania || Midway Atoll and other atolls.
|-
| * || North America || 
|-
| * || South America ||
|-
| * || Oceania || Views of the Ambrym island and its volcano.
|-
| * || Asia || Limited coverage in ten cities.
|}

 Future coverage 
Below is a list of the countries that do not currently have official coverage where Street View vehicles are currently driving, where Street View is officially planned, or have reported by media to be driving.

 Unofficial coverage 
 : Part of King George Islandhttp://hipertextual.com/2022/02/antartida-google-street-view.html 
 : Main cities and tourist places in the whole overseas region of Martinique
 : Main cities and tourist places in the whole overseas region of Saint Pierre and Miquelon
 : Ghost towns in some parts of Spain including Tobes, El Alamín, Oreja, Boñices and Matandrino
 : Main cities and tourist places in the whole overseas region of Tonga in Grid Pacific
 ''': Views of some highways and the central business districts of Harare, Chegutu, Rusape, Masvingo and two United Nations World Heritage Sites: Great Zimbabwe National Monument and Victoria Falls. The first instances of Google Street View in Zimbabwe were contributed by photographer Tawanda Kanhema

References

External links
 Street View coverage map and current driving locations
 Available indoor views of public transportation facilities as airports and railway stations and transportation museums
 Available inside views of university campuses

Coverage
Google Maps